En Thangai is a 1989 Indian Tamil-language film, directed by A. Jagannathan, starring Arjun and Gautami.

Plot

Cast 
Arjun
Gautami
Vaishnavi
S. S. Chandran
Vinu Chakravarthy
Nassar
Charle

Soundtrack 
The music was composed by S. A. Rajkumar. Lyrics were written by Vaali, Vairamuthu, Muthulingam and S. A. Rajkumar.

Reception 
P. S. S. of Kalki wrote .

References

External links 
 

1980s Tamil-language films
1989 films
Films directed by A. Jagannathan
Films scored by S. A. Rajkumar